Joshua Solomon Burns (born 6 February 1987) is an Australian politician. Representing the Australian Labor Party, he was elected as the member for the division of Macnamara in Melbourne at the 2019 Australian federal election.

Early life
Burns was born and raised in Caulfield, Victoria, a Melbourne suburb that is in his electorate. His maternal grandmother came to Australia as a Jewish refugee from Nazi Germany. His paternal grandfather was born in London and came to Australia via Israel, while his paternal grandmother was born in Scotland. He was educated at Gardenvale Primary School and Mt Scopus Memorial College. He then went to Monash University, where he studied politics.

Burns worked in a number of jobs prior to his election to parliament.  He was a staffer for Labor federal MP Michael Danby, and from 2014 to 2019 worked as a senior adviser to the Premier of Victoria, Daniel Andrews.

Politics
Burns ran as the Labor candidate for the seat of Caulfield in the 2014 Victorian state election and gained a 4.9% swing against Liberal incumbent David Southwick.

At the 2019 federal election, Burns contested the new seat of Macnamara, whose boundaries were almost identical to Melbourne Ports, following the retirement of Michael Danby, who had been the MP for Melbourne Ports since 1998.

Burns was preselected as the Labor candidate for the seat in 2018. The preselection process was controversial, with a number of members claiming that Danby invited only a fraction of the members of the branch. The unsuccessful candidate, Mary Delahunty accused the branch of working against her because she was the only woman and only non Jewish person running for preselection.

The election was considered to be a three-cornered contest as both the Liberal Party and the Greens viewed themselves as a realistic chance of winning the seat from Labor. At the election Burns increased Labor's primary vote and won the seat with a two-party-preferred swing of 5.04% in his favour, against Liberal candidate Kate Ashmor.

Burns serves as a member of the Parliament's Joint Statutory Committee on Human Rights and on the House of Representatives Standing Committees on Environment and Energy and Communications and the Arts.

In 2020, Victorian state MLC Adem Somyurek was expelled from the Labor Party after accusations of branch stacking, Somyurek claimed that Burns was among those Labor MPs who "offer him fealty and can expect his protection in return." Burns denied the claim and there was no record of Burns being involved in Somyurek's schemes.

Burns has been an outspoken advocate for strong climate action within the Labor caucus, and has criticised Labor colleague Joel Fitzgibbon for urging Labor to be less ambitious on climate action.

Burns has also been an outspoken advocate for refugees, moving a motion in Parliament urging the Federal Parliament to free refugees being held in onshore and offshore detention.

Burns has called for Australia to significantly increase its supply of public and social housing, and enshrine housing as a human right, in a research paper published with The McKell Institute.

In 2021, Burns called for the date of Australia Day to change, arguing it was a divisive date given it marks the beginning of atrocities committed against Indigenous Australians. Burns called for the date to be changed following the implementation of an Indigenous reconciliation and recognition referendum and an Australian republic referendum.

Personal life
Burns married Zoe Klein in 2015 and they have one daughter, Tia.

References

External links
Josh Burns MP webpage
Australian Parliament House biography

Members of the Australian House of Representatives
Members of the Australian House of Representatives for Macnamara
Australian Labor Party members of the Parliament of Australia
Labor Right politicians
Politicians from Melbourne
Living people
1987 births
Australian people of German-Jewish descent
Australian people of English-Jewish descent
Jewish Australian politicians
Monash University alumni
People from Caulfield, Victoria
Australian people of Scottish descent